Suta is a genus of venomous snakes in the family Elapidae. The genus is endemic to mainland Australia.

Species
Suta dwyeri  –  Dwyer's snake, variable black-naped snake, whip snake – New South Wales, Queensland
Suta fasciata  – Rosen's snake – Western Australia
Suta flagellum  –  little whip snake, whip hooded snake – New South Wales, South Australia, Victoria
Suta gaikhorstorum   – Pilbara hooded snake – Western Australia
Suta gouldii   –  black-headed snake, Gould's hooded snake – Western Australia
Suta monachus  – hooded snake, monk snake – New South Wales, Northern Territory, South Australia, Western Australia
Suta nigriceps  – black-backed snake,  copper snake, Mallee black-backed snake, Mitchell's short-tailed snake – New South Wales, South Australia, Victoria, Western Australia
Suta ordensis  –  Ord curl snake – Northern Territory (?), Western Australia
Suta punctata  – little spotted snake, spotted snake – Northern Territory, Queensland, Western Australia
Suta spectabilis  –  Port Lincoln snake, spectacled hooded snake – New South Wales, Queensland, South Australia, Victoria, Western Australia
Suta suta  – curl snake (eastern states), myall snake (Western Australia) – New South Wales, Northern Territory, Queensland, South Australia, Western Australia

Toxicity
Snakes belonging to the genus Suta are mildly to highly venomous, depending on the species.

References

Further reading
Worrell E (1961). "Herpetological Name Changes". West Australian Naturalist 8: 18–27. (Suta, new genus).

 
Snakes of Australia
Snake genera
Taxa named by Eric Worrell